Freddy Antonio Fermín (born May 16, 1995) is a Venezuelan professional baseball catcher for the Kansas City Royals of Major League Baseball (MLB).

Career
Fermín signed with the Kansas City Royals organization as an international free agent on July 25, 2015. He made his professional debut with the Dominican Summer League Royals the following year, hitting .273 across 52 contests. In 2017, Fermín played in 47 games for the rookie-level Idaho Falls Chukars, slashing .282/.403/.356 with one home run and 39 RBI. He split the 2018 season between Idaho Falls and the rookie-level Burlington Royals, posting a cumulative .249/.346/.350 slash line with 2 home runs and 19 RBI.

In 2019, Fermín split the season between the Single-A Lexington Legends and the Double-A Northwest Arkansas Naturals, hitting .260/.298/.418 with career-highs in home runs (12) and RBI (41) in 86 games between the two affiliates. Fermín did not play in a game in 2020 due to the cancellation of the minor league season because of the COVID-19 pandemic. In 2021 he spent time with Northwest Arkansas and the Triple-A Omaha Storm Chasers, batting .277/.355/.440 with 10 home runs and 47 RBI in 77 contests. He was assigned to Triple-A Omaha to begin the 2022 season. 

On July 14, 2022, Fermín was selected to the 40-man roster and called up to the majors for the first time after multiple players were placed on the restricted list prior to a series in Canada against the Toronto Blue Jays. He made his MLB debut on July 15, ultimately appearing in 3 games but going hitless in 7 at-bats. He was removed from the 40-man roster and returned to Omaha on July 17.

On November 15, 2022, the Royals selected Fermín’s contract back to the 40-man roster to protect him from the Rule 5 draft.

References

External links

1995 births
Living people
Venezuelan expatriate baseball players in the Dominican Republic
Venezuelan expatriate baseball players in the United States
Major League Baseball players from Venezuela
Major League Baseball catchers
Kansas City Royals players
Dominican Summer League Royals players
Idaho Falls Chukars players
Burlington Royals players
Lexington Legends players
Northwest Arkansas Naturals players
Salt River Rafters players
Omaha Storm Chasers players